Gentry de Paris is a Paris-based burlesque dancer, art director, and playwright.

Early life and career
She grew up near Disneyland in Anaheim, CA. She first started first dancing with a troupe of chorus girls who did enactments of Busby Berkeley choreographies, then she went on to solo burlesque strip tease acts. Her most major influence on her style of dance is the golden age of Hollywood.

She moved to Paris just after graduate school, where her master's thesis was on the expatriate artistic community in Paris between the World Wars.

In 2009, Gentry wrote and starred in the TV movie musical Gentry de Paris Revue at the Casino de Paris, directed by Philippe Calvario. The Gentry de Paris Revue ran for two weeks in Paris in September 2009, and it was a Ziegfeld Follies-style theatre extravaganza and the first Grande Revue in Paris 40 years.

She has performed in Scarlett James' Grande Burlesque Show in Montreal, the Montreal Burlesque Festival, the 8th annual New York Burlesque Festival, and in other cabarets throughout Europe and North America. She has also performed with Patricia Kaas during her 2009 Kabaret tour, Arielle Dombasle for the AmfAR Gala in Paris, hosted by Kylie Minogue, and she has collaborated with the Gotan Project.

Gentry is also the founder of L’École Supérieure de Burlesque, the first school of its kind in France. It is a school of burlesque for women only.

References

External links
 
 
 "Storming Paris’s Burlesque Stages"
 "Beyond Burlesque: Dita Von Teese at the Gentry de Paris Revue"
 "Si vous aimez la séduisante Dita von Teese... vous allez adorer l'élégante Gentry de Paris"
 "Dita Von Teese sublime au bras de son chéri... pour une soirée sous le signe de l'effeuillage"

Living people
American neo-burlesque performers
People from Hollywood, Los Angeles
American female dancers
Dancers from California
Year of birth missing (living people)
21st-century American women